Superman vs. Muhammad Ali is an oversize celebrity comic book published by DC Comics in 1978. The 72-page book features Superman teaming up with the heavyweight boxing champion Muhammad Ali to defeat an alien invasion of Earth, a story in which they are required to compete in a boxing match (without Superman's superpowers). It was based on an original story by Dennis O'Neil which was adapted by Neal Adams, with pencils by Adams, figure inks by Dick Giordano, and background inks by Terry Austin.

Publication history
Superman vs. Muhammad Ali was part of DC's oversized series All-New Collectors' Edition, officially numbered #C-56.

By the late 1970s, Superman had already been joined in the comics pages with guest appearances by real-life American icons such as John F. Kennedy, Steve Allen, Bob Hope, Jerry Lewis, Allen Funt, Don Rickles, and Pat Boone. In 1962, he had gone up against a real-life athlete: professional wrestler Antonino Rocca.

The book suffered numerous delays, going from an original publication date of fall 1977 to spring 1978. By the time the book was published, Ali was no longer World Heavyweight Champion, having been dethroned by Leon Spinks in February 1978. Ali won back the title later that September.

2010 re-issue
DC Comics published two hardcover reprint editions of Superman vs. Muhammad Ali in the fall of 2010. One edition reprinted the original story at its original treasury size, while a deluxe edition (featuring a new cover by Neal Adams) included additional content dating back to the original book's publication. By 2018, the re-issue has had six printings, and Superman vs. Muhammad Ali has become one of DC's best-selling comics.

Plot summary
Following a tip, Jimmy Olsen leads his friends Clark Kent (secretly Superman) and Lois Lane into a ghetto district of Metropolis for an exclusive interview with Muhammad Ali. They find him playing basketball with the local kids, but before they can ask him a question, an alien suddenly materializes behind them. This alien behaves arrogantly and rudely, brutally shoving Lois aside, which provokes Ali to retaliate with a boxing strike. Clark, under the pretext of summoning the authorities, runs off, changes into his costume and flies into space, surmising that the alien surely must not have come alone. Indeed, he finds a whole fleet of spaceships in orbit, obviously not on a peaceful errand.

The visitor, named Rat'Lar, is the maniacal leader of a species of aliens called the Scrubb. Under the claim that the Earthlings' dishonorable, war-like and aggressive ways poses a potential threat to his people, he demands that Earth's greatest champion fight the greatest Scrubb fighter, the behemoth Hun'Ya. If Earth refuses, the Scrubb and their huge armada of spaceships will destroy it, and to prove his point, he has his fleet fire plasma-composed missiles at St. Louis and an uninhabited Pacific island. Superman thwarts the missiles from destroying Saint Louis, albeit barely. Superman and Muhammad Ali each come forward to volunteer. However, Ali argues that Superman , has an unfair advantage in his many superpowers. Ali also protests that Superman is Kryptonian, whereas he is a native of Earth. Ali, known for his florid self-promotion as "The Greatest", puts himself forward as the obvious choice.

Intrigued, Rat'Lar decides that Superman and Ali should fight one another to see who really is Earth's champion. To make the fight fair, he decrees that the match should take place on his home planet, Bodace, which orbits a red star (whereupon Superman is temporarily powerless). The winner would simply be the best boxer. The two would-be champions decide that Ali will train Superman in the finer points of boxing. They journey to Superman's Fortress of Solitude to have his powers temporarily deactivated, and to use a time warping device to extend Rat'Lar's 24-hour deadline into two months, thus giving Superman more time for training. However, Rat'Lar detects the use of this device, and considers it tantamount to cheating. Rat'Lar warns both men they are to return within one Earth day or he will deploy the missiles on the basis they have forfeited. Ali is forced to return with Superman having been given an incomplete regimen.

The match is broadcast on intergalactic television to thousands of other worlds (with Jimmy Olsen acting as broadcaster). With the match underway, it soon becomes apparent that in battling with more or less equal strength, Ali is the superior fighter since Superman generally relied on his incredible strength brought on by Earth's yellow sun to deal with threats quickly. Superman takes a serious pummeling, but somehow refuses to fall down; he stays on his feet all through the beating. Finally, Ali stops the fight, intending to call for a technical knockout, but Superman then falls face-first on the canvas (making the knockout more than technical). Ali personally takes care of Superman and orders him brought back to Earth to recuperate; a move which leaves Hun'Ya pondering.

Now crowned Earth's champion, Ali is set to face Hun'Ya, and to everyone's surprise, the goddess Pallas Athena makes an appearance to relay "the rules of fair play" for this contest into the champions' minds. Rat'Lar then asks Ali to predict at what round the fight will end (Ali was known for predicting the round in which he would knock out his opponent). After some chiding, Ali predicts that he will knock the alien out in the fourth round ("He'll hit the floor in four!"). Once the match begins, however, Ali quickly starts to suffer from fighting the super-powered Hun'Ya.

Meanwhile, Superman's great recuperative powers have enabled him to make a speedy recovery. Disguising himself as Ali cornerman Bundini Brown, he steals into the Scrubb command ship and sabotages their space armada. In his showdown with the armada, Superman is again badly hurt, and is left drifting in space.

Miraculously, Ali gets a second wind. In the predicted fourth round, he not only knocks the alien champion out, but out of the ring as well. Yet after witnessing Superman's decimation of his forces, the Scrubb leader cries foul and decides to destroy the now helpless Earth anyway. Just as Rat'Lar is about to give the go-ahead to his backup forces, his own champion Hun'Ya becomes enraged at Rat'Lar's treachery and deposes him, stopping the annihilation attack.

Superman is rescued and once again revived. Hun-ya, the new Scrubb leader, makes peace with Ali, Superman, and all of Earth. The very end of the book shows Ali and Superman in a private moment. Ali reveals that he figured out Superman's secret identity as Clark Kent, but implicitly vows to keep it secret. The book ends with the two champions embracing and Ali proclaiming, "Superman, WE are the greatest!"

The cover

Superman vs. Muhammad Ali'''s wraparound cover shows a host of late 1970s celebrities, including Frank Sinatra, Lucille Ball, Tony Orlando, Johnny Carson, the cast of Welcome Back, Kotter, and The Jackson 5; sharing close-up seating with Lois Lane as well as DC superheroes like Batman, Green Lantern and Wonder Woman, in addition to Warner and DC employees. It also showed then-President Jimmy Carter and his wife Rosalynn.

Joe Kubert was originally asked to draw the cover, and his version (a black-and-white sketch of which still survives) did not feature any celebrities, but just a "normal" raucous crowd of boxing fans. DC did not approve of Kubert's likeness of Ali, nor the overall grim feeling of the piece, and asked Adams to draw the book instead. Adams' original cover illustration (modeled very closely on Kubert's layout), included Mick Jagger in the front cover's lower left corner; he was replaced in the final version by fight promoter Don King.

In 2000, Adams did a riff on this cover — featuring Ali fighting basketball star Michael Jordan — for a special issue of ESPN The Magazine''.

In 2016, NECA released a 2-pack set of 7-inch action figures based on Muhammad Ali and Superman as they appeared in the comic. NECA also noted that Superman included removable boxing gloves and another set of interchangeable hands.

Audience members (selected)

"Show-biz personalities"
The Beatles (with Yoko Ono and Linda McCartney)†
Kirk Alyn
Lucille Ball
Sonny Bono
Johnny Carson
Cher
Dick Clark
William Conrad
Phyllis Diller
The Jackson 5
Jerry Garcia
James Garner
Ron Palillo
Robert Hegyes
Ron Howard
Jack Larson
Liberace
Noel Neill
Tony Orlando
Donny Osmond
Marie Osmond
Christopher Reeve (in glasses)
Wayne Rogers
Frank Sinatra
Raquel Welch
Wolfman Jack
Peter Falk (as Columbo)
Andy Warhol
Woody Allen
John Wayne (with a mustache)
Orson Welles

Political figures
President Gerald Ford
President Jimmy Carter
Betty Ford
Rosalynn Carter

Sports figures
Jim Bouton
Pelé
Bundini Brown
Don King
(Jabir) Herbert Muhammad
Angelo Dundee
Joe Namath

Literature and the arts
Jill Krementz
Kurt Vonnegut Jr.

DC staffers and other comic book creators
Neal Adams
Jack Adler
Vincente Alcazar
Sergio Aragones
Terry Austin
Cary Bates
E. Nelson Bridwell
Tex Blaisdell
Howard Chaykin
Vince Colletta
Trevor Von Eden
William Gaines
Dick Giordano
Mike Gold
Archie Goodwin
Jenette Kahn
Gil Kane
Joe Kubert
Bob Layton
Paul Levitz
Bob McLeod
Allen Milgrom
Dennis O'Neil
Joe Orlando
Ralph Reese
Marshall Rogers
Julius Schwartz
Joe Shuster
Jerry Siegel
Walt Simonson
Greg Theakston
Bob Wiacek
Wallace Wood
Bernie Wrightson

DC (and Mad magazine) characters
Boston Brand (Deadman)
Barry Allen (Flash)
Iris Allen
Wally West (Kid Flash)
Batman
Barbara Gordon (Batgirl)
Dick Grayson (Robin)
Morgan Edge
Plastic Man
Hal Jordan (Green Lantern)
Carol Ferris (Star Sapphire) 
Clark Kent
Dinah Lance (Black Canary)
Lois Lane
Lex Luthor
Ms. Mystic
Alfred E. Neuman
Jimmy Olsen
Alfred Pennyworth (Bruce Wayne's Butler)
Diana Prince (Wonder Woman)
J'onn J'onzz (Martian Manhunter)
Rac Shade (Shade The Changing Man)
Donna Troy (Wonder Girl)
Oliver Queen (Green Arrow)
Ray Palmer (Atom)

† Not included in the character guide found on the inside cover.

Racial significance
In 2016, Adams told BBC News that "DC Comics had a lot of liberal New York young Jewish men working for them at the time, who understood prejudice. And to depict Ali as on par with a white mythical Superman, was a subtle political act. The pen is mightier than the sword." He said that he felt emotion when he signed well-read original issues of the comic book for African American readers.

References

Sources consulted
 Kimball, Kirk. Dial B for Blog #315 (June). 
 Cyriaque, Lamar.  "The 5 Most Insane Celebrity Comic Book Cameos". Cracked.com. (March 19, 2008).
 "Superman vs. Muhammad Ali," Scoop: Did You Know (Feb. 25, 2006).
 "Superman vs. Muhammad Ali," SupermanTV.net. 
 "They Are the Greatest," UGO: World of Superman: The Phantom Zone.
 Olivier, Delcroix. "Superman contre Mohammed Ali réédité 33 après!". le Figaro. (November 25, 2011).
 "SUPERMAN VS. MUHAMMAD ALI - NEAL ADAMS at Comic-Con - Hero Complex: The Show - Part 2 " youtube.com/nerdist. (August 29, 2012).
 "Superman vs. Muhammad Ali Action Figures Coming From NECA" Comicbook.com (July 16, 2016).

Endnotes

External links
 Joe Kubert's original cover sketch

Superman
1978 comics debuts
1978 comics endings
Boxing comics
Comics based on real people
Comics by Dennis O'Neil
Comics by Neal Adams
Comics set in the United States
Crossover comics
Cultural depictions of Muhammad Ali
Cultural depictions of the Beatles
Cultural depictions of Frank Sinatra
Cultural depictions of Michael Jackson
Cultural depictions of Woody Allen
Cultural depictions of Orson Welles
Cultural depictions of Andy Warhol
Cultural depictions of Gerald Ford
Cultural depictions of Betty Ford
Cultural depictions of Jimmy Carter
Rosalynn Carter